The 2015–16 Missouri Mavericks season is the 7th season of the ECHL franchise in Independence, Missouri, a suburb of Kansas City, Missouri.

Marquee events during the season

On June 11, 2015, the Missouri Mavericks announced an affiliation agreement with the New York Islanders of the National Hockey League and the Bridgeport Sound Tigers of the American Hockey League, which is also an affiliate of the Islanders.

On September 10, 2015, it was announced that former Mavericks player John-Scott Dickson had been hired as an Assistant Coach for the Mavericks for the 2015-16 season, joining Head Coach Richard Matvichuk and fellow Assistant Coach Simon Watson.

On April 10, 2016, Ross Johnston, who played 18 games for the Mavericks during the 2015-16 season, became the first former Maverick to make his NHL debut after playing for the Mavericks, when he suited up for the New York Islanders in a game against the Philadelphia Flyers.

Playoffs
On May 10, 2016 the Mavericks' 2015–16 season ended with a 5–1 loss to the Allen Americans at home in Game 6 of the Kelly Cup Playoffs Semifinals.

Transactions

Player signings and acquisitions off of waivers

Free agency loses, player releases, and player retirements

"Future Considerations" Acquired as Part of Trades Made During The 2014-15 season

Trades

Mavericks players invited to and released from NHL and AHL training camps

Transferred and loaned players/AHL Professional Try Out contract signings/terminations of Missouri Mavericks players

Player suspensions or placed on leave

Injured reserve

Awards, records, and milestones

Roster

As of June 15, 2016

See also
 2015–16 ECHL season

References

External links
 Missouri Mavericks Official Website 
 2015–16 Missouri Mavericks season at EliteProspects.com
 2015–16 Missouri Mavericks season at ECHL.com

Missouri Mavericks seasons
Missouri
Missouri
Missouri Mavericks
Missouri Mavericks